Rashidi Yekini (23 October 1963 – 4 May 2012) was a Nigerian professional footballer who played as a forward. He is all-time top goalscorer for his nation.

His professional career, which spanned more than two decades, was mainly associated with Vitória de Setúbal in Portugal, but he also played in six other countries besides his own.

Yekini scored 37 goals as a Nigerian international footballer, and represented the nation in seven major tournaments, including two World Cups where he scored the country's first-ever goal in the competition. He was also named the African Footballer of the Year in 1993.

Club career
Yekini was born in Kaduna, of Yoruba origin. After starting his professional career in the Nigerian league, he moved to Ivory Coast to play for Africa Sports National, and from there he went to Portugal and Vitória de Setúbal where he experienced his most memorable years, eventually becoming the Primeira Liga's top scorer in the 1993–94 season after scoring 21 goals; the previous campaign he had netted a career-best 34 in 32 games to help the Sadinos promote from the second division, and those performances earned him the title of African Footballer of the Year once, the first ever for the nation.

In the summer of 1994, Yekini signed for Greek club Olympiacos, but did not get along with teammates and left soon after. His career never really got back on track, not even upon a return to Setúbal which happened after another unassuming spell, in La Liga with Sporting de Gijón; he successively played with FC Zürich, Club Athlétique Bizertin and Al-Shabab Riyadh, before rejoining Africa Sports. In 2003, aged 39, he returned to the Nigerian championship with Julius Berger FC.

In April 2005, 41-year-old Yekini made a short comeback, moving alongside former national teammate Mobi Oparaku to Gateway United FC.

International career
Scoring 37 goals for Nigeria in 62 appearances, Yekini is the national record goalscorer. He was part of the team that participated in the 1994 (where he netted Nigeria's first-ever goal in a World Cup, in a 3–0 win against Bulgaria, his celebration after scoring, crying while holding the goal's net, became one of the iconic images of the tournament) and the 1998 FIFA World Cups.

Additionally, Yekini helped the Super Eagles win the 1994 Africa Cup of Nations in Tunisia where he also topped the goal charts and was named best player of the competition. He also participated at Olympic level in Seoul 1988.

International goals
Scores and results list Nigeria's goal tally first, score column indicates score after each Yekini goal.''

Personal life
Yekini married three wives. He had three daughters, named Yemisi, Omoyemi and Damilola.

Death
Yekini was reported to be ill for an extended period of time. In 2011, news media in Nigeria begun issuing reports of his failing health, and he was said to suffer from bipolar disorder, depression and some other undisclosed psychiatric condition. He died in Ibadan on 4 May 2012 at the young age of 48, the news being confirmed by former national teammates Mutiu Adepoju and Ike Shorunmu; he was buried at his residence in Ira, Kwara State. He was surrounded by his aged mother, brother, wives and children, among others.

References

External links

1963 births
2012 deaths
Sportspeople from Kaduna
Yoruba sportspeople
Nigerian footballers
Association football forwards
Nigeria Professional Football League players
Shooting Stars S.C. players
Bridge F.C. players
Gateway United F.C. players
Africa Sports d'Abidjan players
Primeira Liga players
Liga Portugal 2 players
Vitória F.C. players
Super League Greece players
Olympiacos F.C. players
La Liga players
Sporting de Gijón players
Swiss Super League players
FC Zürich players
CA Bizertin players
Saudi Professional League players
Al-Shabab FC (Riyadh) players
Nigeria international footballers
1994 FIFA World Cup players
1998 FIFA World Cup players
1988 African Cup of Nations players
1990 African Cup of Nations players
1992 African Cup of Nations players
1994 African Cup of Nations players
Africa Cup of Nations-winning players
Olympic footballers of Nigeria
Footballers at the 1988 Summer Olympics
Nigerian expatriate footballers
Expatriate footballers in Ivory Coast
Expatriate footballers in Portugal
Expatriate footballers in Greece
Expatriate footballers in Spain
Expatriate footballers in Switzerland
Expatriate footballers in Tunisia
Expatriate footballers in Saudi Arabia
Nigerian expatriate sportspeople in Portugal
Nigerian expatriate sportspeople in Saudi Arabia
Nigerian expatriate sportspeople in Spain
Nigerian expatriate sportspeople in Ivory Coast
African Footballer of the Year winners
Burials in Kwara State
Abiola Babes F.C. players